Mulan II is a 2004 American direct-to-video animated musical adventure film produced by the Japanese office of Disneytoon Studios. It is directed by Darrell Rooney and Lynne Southerland. It is a sequel to the 1998 theatrically-released Disney animated film Mulan, featuring songs by Jeanine Tesori and Alexa Junge. Much of the cast from the first film returned, excluding Eddie Murphy (Mushu), Miriam Margolyes (The Matchmaker), James Hong (Chi-Fu), Chris Sanders (Little Brother), and Matthew Wilder (Ling's singing voice). Murphy and Margolyes were replaced by Mark Moseley and April Winchell, respectively; Little Brother was voiced by Frank Welker, and Gedde Watanabe does his own singing for the sequel. Mulan II features Mulan and her new fiancé, General Li Shang on a special mission: escorting the Emperor's three daughters across the country to meet their soon-to-be fiancés. The film deals with arranged marriages, loyalty, relationships, making choices, trust, and finding true love. Unlike its predecessor, which gained critical acclaim, Mulan II was poorly received by critics.

Plot
A month after the events of the first film, Mushu enjoys his restored status as a guardian spirit, to the dismay of the Fa family ancestors. General Shang asks Mulan for her hand in marriage, and she happily accepts. Mushu is initially thrilled about the engagement, until the ancestors inform him that if Mulan marries Shang, his family ancestors and guardians would become hers; as a result, Mushu will lose his job. The Emperor calls upon Mulan and Shang and informs them of the threat the Mongols pose to China. To oppose them, the Emperor intends to strengthen China by forging an alliance with the kingdom of Qui Gong, arranging for his three daughters, Princesses Ting-Ting, Mei, and Su, to be married to Qui Gong's princes, and assigns Mulan and Shang to protect them on their journey. Although uneasy at the idea of arranged marriage, Mulan agrees to the mission.

Mulan and Shang, along with Yao, Ling and Chien-Po, set out with the princesses to Qui Gong. In order to protect his position as guardian, and believing that Mulan and Shang are incompatible due to their different behavior, Mushu tags along to sabotage their relationship, while Cri-Kee attempts to stop him. Mushu's attempts to cause problems for Mulan and Shang backfire, and he inadvertently destroys the princess's carriage. Now forced to travel on foot, Mulan and Shang briefly argue over what direction they should go, as well as their duties. Seeing this, Mushu manipulates Shang into believing that Mulan is fed up with him, escalating tensions between them.

Meanwhile, Mei, Ting Ting and Su fall in love with Yao, Ling and Chien-Po respectively, and the princesses decide to follow Mulan's advice of having a duty to their hearts. That night, Yao, Ling and Chien-Po take the princesses out to a nearby village, and they mutually declare their love. Mulan pursues them, becoming happy that the princesses have followed their hearts. Mushu wakes up Shang, who pursues the group and reprimands them for forgetting about their duties. Mulan and Shang erupt into a heated argument, and decide that they are too different for each other and break-up.

The group begins travelling across bandit country, and Mushu realizes that Mulan's break-up with Shang has only made her miserable. Overwhelmed with guilt, Mushu confesses to his actions, losing Mulan's trust and motivating her to fix things with Shang. The group is attacked by bandits that attempt to kidnap the princesses. Although the princesses are saved, Mulan and Shang are left dangling on a broken bridge; Shang allowing himself to fall into the ravine so that Mulan can lift herself up. Heartbroken, Mulan declares that the princesses won't be forced into a loveless marriage, and continues on to Qui Gong alone. Mulan presents herself to Qui Gong's ruler, Lord Qin, and lies that the princesses have been killed, offering herself in their place; Lord Qui agrees, and arranges a wedding between Mulan and his eldest son, Prince Jeeki.

Shang turns up alive and meets up with Yao, Ling, Chien-Po and the princesses, and heads to Qui Gong. Shang interrupts the wedding and admits that Mulan was right about following her heart. To save Mulan and Shang from Lord Qin's forces, Mushu impersonates the Great Golden Dragon of Unity, forcing Lord Qin to ally himself with the Emperor, while allowing Mulan and Shang to marry and freeing the princesses from their vows. Some time later, Mulan and Shang officially marry in Mulan's village, and Mushu accepts the loss of his position. However, Shang combines the family temples, enabling Mushu to continue being a guardian spirit. While celebrating, Mushu accidentally reveals himself to Shang and Mulan. Shang reveals that he is already aware of Mushu's existence, and he and Mulan embrace.

Cast
 Ming-Na Wen as Fa Mulan
 Lea Salonga as Fa Mulan (singing voice)
 BD Wong as General Li Shang
 Lucy Liu as Princess Mei
 Beth Blankenship as Princess Mei (singing voice)
 Sandra Oh as Princess Ting-Ting
 Judy Kuhn as Princess Ting-Ting (singing voice)
 Lauren Tom as Princess Su
 Mandy Gonzalez as Princess Su (singing voice)
 Gedde Watanabe as Ling
 Harvey Fierstein as Yao
 Jerry Tondo as Chien-Po
 Mark Moseley as Mushu
 Pat Morita as The Emperor of China
 George Takei as First Ancestor Fa
 June Foray as Grandmother Fa
 Freda Foh Shen as Fa Li
 Frank Welker as Cri-Kee/Little Brother
 Soon-Tek Oh as Fa Zhou
 April Winchell as The Matchmaker
 Jillian Henry as Sha-Ron
 Keone Young as Lord Qin
 Michelle Kwan as Shopkeeper
 Rob Paulsen as Prince Jeeki

Soundtrack

The soundtrack contains songs from the film performed by various artists, as well as portions of the film score composed by Joel McNeely. It was released on January 25, 2005 by Walt Disney Records.

Reception
According to Scott Gwin of CinemaBlend, "Mulan II is a direct-to-DVD disgrace that takes everything excellent about its predecessor film, rips it to shreds, and uses it for rat cage lining." Review aggregator Rotten Tomatoes, gave the film a rating of 0% based on reviews from 5 critics, with an average score of 3.9/10. Reviewer Robert Pardi gave the film a 2 out of 5 star rating, saying, "The original Mulan was heralded for adding a spunky heroine to the Disney canon of distressed princesses, but despite its excellent voice cast, this sequel merely apes the success of live-action martial arts films".

Cancelled sequel 
In early 2002, it was reported that Disney was working on Mulan III. Raymond Singer and Eugenia Bostwick-Singer, writers of the first film, submitted two stories to Disney, in which they suggested a new character named Ana Ming. Like this film, the second sequel would have been released direct-to-video, but it was canceled before the release of Mulan II.

See also

 Roles of mothers in Disney media
 List of animated feature films

References

External links

 
 
 
 
 [ Mulan II Original Soundtrack] at Allmusic

2004 animated films
2004 films
2004 fantasy films
2000s musical films
2004 direct-to-video films
2000s American animated films
American children's animated fantasy films
American children's animated musical films
American sequel films
Anime-influenced Western animation
Asian-American musical films
Direct-to-video sequel films
Mulan (franchise)
DisneyToon Studios animated films
Disney direct-to-video animated films
Films scored by Joel McNeely
Films set in China
Films set in the Han dynasty
Films directed by Darrell Rooney
Animated films about dragons
Films about princesses
Films about Hua Mulan
2000s English-language films